Sympetrum ambiguum, the blue-faced meadowhawk, is a dragonfly of the family Libellulidae.

Description
The aqua blue face of the blue-faced, green/turquoise when dead, meadowhawk may not be obvious to a casual observer, but is an important field mark distinguishing it from similar-looking meadowhawks in the genus Sympetrum, such as Sympetrum vicinum.
This small dragonfly reaches a maximum total length of 38 mm. The thorax is grayish or olive brown.  A mature male has a bright red abdomen, with black stripes; in females and juveniles, it remains brown. Both genders have six black rings on their abdomens.
They can be found from summer through fall in Midwest North America close to water sources.

References

External links
 Sympetrum ambiguum - BugGuide.Net

Libellulidae
Taxa named by Jules Pierre Rambur
Insects described in 1842